The Immediate Geographic Region of Diamantina is one of the 7 immediate geographic regions in the Intermediate Geographic Region of Teófilo Otoni, one of the 70 immediate geographic regions in the Brazilian state of Minas Gerais and one of the 509 of Brazil, created by the National Institute of Geography and Statistics (IBGE) in 2017.

Municipalities 
It comprises 13 municipalities.

 Alvorada de Minas  
 Carbonita     
 Couto de Magalhães de Minas    
 Datas   
 Diamantina   
 Felício dos Santos  
 Gouveia    
 Presidente Kubitschek   
 Santo Antônio do Itambé   
 São Gonçalo do Rio Preto     
 Senador Modestino Gonçalves  
 Serra Azul de Minas  
 Serro

See also  
List of Intermediate and Immediate Geographic Regions of Minas Gerais

References 

Geography of Minas Gerais